Blessed Be Your Name: The Songs of Matt Redman Vol. 1 is an album by worship artist Matt Redman released in 2005. It is a live re-recording of some of Redman's best known songs.  It was recorded during the Facedown: Conference for Songwriters which was held 28 to 30 January 2004, at North Point Community Church in Alpharetta, Georgia.  Redman recorded enough material at the 2004 conference to release a live album in 2004 (Facedown) that was focused on newly written songs plus a second retrospective album in 2005 (Blessed Be Your Name).  One song, "Facedown", appears in both albums, however producer Nathan Nockels recorded numerous overdubs on the Blessed Be Your Name version as he did with numerous other tracks on the album, adding in percussion, string orchestra parts (overdubbed in Prague by the National Opera Orchestra) and additional background vocals.

The album was mainly recorded at one location: North Point Community Church, Alpharetta, Georgia with Tom Laune acting as the engineer. Overdubs were recorded by producer Nathan Nockels at Berwich Lane, Franklin, Tennessee, Esseille Studios, Brighton, England and by Chris Freels at West 2nd Recording, Oklahoma City, Oklahoma.



Track listing

Bonus items extended CD
"Heart of Worship" video from Atlanta
Matt Redman interview

Personnel 

Band
 Matt Redman – lead vocals, acoustic guitars
 Andrew Philip – keyboards
 Nathan Nockels – acoustic piano, Wurlitzer electric piano, Hammond B3 organ
 John Ellis – electric guitars
 Jonathan Ahrens – bass
 Terl Bryant – drums, percussion
 Matt King – drums, percussion
 David Raven – drums, percussion
 Christy Nockels – backing vocals
 Lex Buckley – backing vocals

Additional musicians
 Nathan Nockels – keyboards, electric guitars, backing vocals
 Gary Burnette – electric guitars
 Pat Malone – bass
 Charlie Hall – vocals (on "Better Is One Day")
 Keith Getty – string arrangements

Release details 
 2005, UK, Survivor Records SURCD5026, Release Date 19 July 2005, CD

Awards 

The album was nominated for a Dove Award for Praise & Worship Album of the Year at the 37th GMA Dove Awards.

References 

Matt Redman albums
2005 albums
Survivor Records live albums